Michigan's 5th congressional district is a United States congressional district in the Lower Peninsula of Michigan. It includes all of Branch, Cass, Hillsdale, Jackson, Lenawee, Monroe (except the city of Milan), and St. Joseph counties, southern Berrien County, most of Calhoun County, and far southern Kalamazoo County. The district is represented by Republican Tim Walberg.

Predecessors
From 1873 to 1993, the 5th was based in the Grand Rapids area of Western Michigan.  Its most notable member was Gerald Ford, who in 1974 became the 38th President of the United States upon the resignation of Richard Nixon, at the height of the Watergate Scandal. 

In 1993, this district essentially became the 3rd district, while the 5th was redrawn to take in Bay City, Saginaw and the Thumb, the core of the old 8th district. After the 2000 census, this district was extended to Flint, previously the core of the 9th district. However, it was geographically and demographically the successor of the 9th.

Recent election results in statewide races

Major cities

Adrian
Albion
Cassopolis
Coldwater
Dowagiac
Hillsdale
Jackson
Marshall
Monroe
Niles
Sturgis
Three Rivers

List of members representing the district
The following is a list of all occupants of the congressional seat since the district was created at the start of the 38th Congress

Recent election results

2012

2014

2016

2018

2020

2022

See also

Michigan's congressional districts
List of United States congressional districts

Notes

References

 Congressional Biographical Directory of the United States 1774–present

Bibliography
 Govtrack.us for the 7th District - Lists Senators and representative, and map showing district outline
 The Political graveyard: U.S. Representatives from Michigan, 1807-2003
U.S. Representatives 1837-2003, Michigan Manual 2003-2004

05
Constituencies established in 1863
1863 establishments in Michigan